Colin Andrew Firth  (born 10 September 1960) is an English actor and producer. He was identified in the mid-1980s with the "Brit Pack" of rising young British actors, undertaking a challenging series of roles, including leading roles in A Month in the Country (1987), Tumbledown (1988) and Valmont (1989). His portrayal of Mr. Darcy in the 1995 television adaptation of Jane Austen's Pride and Prejudice led to widespread attention, and to roles in more prominent films such as The English Patient (1996), Shakespeare in Love (1998), Bridget Jones's Diary (2001), The Importance of Being Earnest (2002), Girl with a Pearl Earring (2003), Richard Curtis's romantic comedy ensemble film Love Actually (2003), and the musical comedy Mamma Mia! (2008) and its sequel, Mamma Mia! Here We Go Again! (2018).

In 2009, Firth received international acclaim for his performance in Tom Ford's A Single Man, for which he won a BAFTA Award and received his first Academy Award nomination. In 2010, his portrayal of King George VI in Tom Hooper's The King's Speech won him the Academy Award for Best Actor. He subsequently appeared as MI6 agent Bill Haydon in Tinker Tailor Soldier Spy (2011), and as secret agent Harry Hart in Kingsman: The Secret Service (2014) and its sequel Kingsman: The Golden Circle (2017). He has since appeared in the musical fantasy Mary Poppins Returns (2018), and Sam Mendes' war film 1917 (2019), and Supernova (2020).  He is also known for his performances in television including the BBC film Conspiracy (2001), and HBO's The Staircase (2022), receiving Primetime Emmy Award nominations for each.

In 2012, he founded the production company Raindog Films, where he served as a producer for Eye in the Sky (2015) and Loving (2016). His films have grossed more than $3 billion from 42 releases worldwide. Firth has campaigned for the rights of indigenous tribal people and is a member of Survival International. He has campaigned on issues of asylum seekers, refugees' rights and the environment. He commissioned and co-authored a scientific paper on a study of the differences in brain structure between people of differing political orientations.

He is the recipient of various accolades, including an Academy Award, two British Academy Film Awards, a Golden Globe Award, and three Screen Actors Guild Awards. In 2011, Firth was appointed a CBE by Queen Elizabeth II at Buckingham Palace for his services to drama. That same year, he received a star on the Hollywood Walk of Fame, and appeared in Time magazine's 100 most influential people in the world.

Early life 
Firth was born in the village of Grayshott, Hampshire to parents who were academics and teachers. His mother, Shirley Jean (née Rolles), was a comparative religion lecturer at King Alfred's College (now the University of Winchester); and his father, David Norman Lewis Firth, was a history lecturer at King Alfred's and education officer for the Nigerian Government. Firth is the eldest of three children; his sister Kate is an actress and voice coach, and his brother Jonathan is also an actor. His maternal grandparents were Congregationalist ministers and his paternal grandfather was an Anglican priest. They did overseas missionary work, and both of his parents were born and spent part of their childhoods in India.

As a child, Firth frequently travelled due to his parents' work, spending some years in Nigeria. He also lived in St. Louis, Missouri when he was 11, which he has described as "a difficult time". On returning to England, he attended the Montgomery of Alamein Secondary School (now Kings' School), which at the time was a state comprehensive school in Winchester, Hampshire. He was still an outsider and the target of bullying. To counter this, he adopted the local working class Hampshire accent and copied his schoolmates' lack of interest in schoolwork.

Firth began attending drama workshops at age 10, and by 14 had decided to be a professional actor. Until further education, he was not academically inclined, later saying in an interview, "I didn't like school. I just thought it was boring and mediocre and nothing they taught me seemed to be of any interest at all." However, at Barton Peveril Sixth Form College in Eastleigh, he was imbued with a love of English literature by an enthusiastic teacher, Penny Edwards, and has said that his two years there were among the happiest of his life.

After his sixth form years, Firth moved to London and joined the National Youth Theatre, where he made many contacts and got a job in the wardrobe department at the National Theatre. He subsequently studied at Drama Centre London.

Career

1983–1995: Early work and breakthrough 
Playing Hamlet in the Drama Centre end-of-year production, Firth was spotted by playwright Julian Mitchell, who cast him as the gay, ambitious public schoolboy Guy Bennett in the 1983 West End production of Another Country. In 1984, Firth made his film debut as Tommy Judd, Guy Bennett's straight, Marxist school friend in the screen adaptation of the play (with Rupert Everett as Guy Bennett). It was the start of a longstanding public feud between Firth and Everett, which was eventually resolved. He starred with Sir Laurence Olivier in Lost Empires (1986), a TV adaptation of J. B. Priestley's novel.

In 1987, Firth and other up-and-coming British actors such as Tim Roth, Bruce Payne and Paul McGann, were dubbed the 'Brit Pack'. That year, he appeared with Kenneth Branagh in the film version of J. L. Carr's A Month in the Country. Sheila Johnston observed a theme in his early work of playing those traumatised by war. He portrayed real-life British soldier Robert Lawrence MC in the 1988 BBC dramatisation Tumbledown. Lawrence was severely injured at the Battle of Mount Tumbledown during the Falklands War, and the film details his struggles to adjust to his disability whilst confronted with indifference from the government and public. It attracted controversy at the time, with criticism coming from left and right sides of the political spectrum. Despite this, the performance brought Firth a Royal TV Society Best Actor Award, and a nomination for the 1989 BAFTA Television Award. In 1989, he played the title role in Miloš Forman's Valmont, based on Les Liaisons dangereuses. Released just a year after Dangerous Liaisons, it did not make a big impact in comparison. That year he also played a paranoid, socially awkward character in the Argentinian psychological thriller Apartment Zero.

Firth finally became a British household name through his role as the aloof, haughty aristocrat Mr. Darcy in the 1995 BBC television adaptation of Jane Austen's Pride and Prejudice. Producer Sue Birtwistle's first choice for the part, he was eventually persuaded to take it despite his unfamiliarity with Austen's writing. He and co-star Jennifer Ehle began a romantic relationship during the filming, which received media attention only after their separation. Sheila Johnston wrote that Firth's approach to the part "lent Darcy complex shades of coldness, even caddishness, in the early episodes." The series was an international success and unexpectedly elevated Firth to stardom— in some part due to a scene not from the novel, where he emerges from a lake swim in a wet shirt. Although he did not mind being recognised as "a romantic idol as a Darcy with smouldering sex appeal" in a role that "officially turned him into a heart-throb", he expressed the wish not to be associated with Pride and Prejudice forever. He was, therefore, reluctant to accept similar roles and risk becoming typecast.

1996–2008: Romance and ensemble films 
For a time, it did seem as if Mr. Darcy would overshadow the rest of Firth's career, and there were humorous allusions to the role in his next five movies. The most notable was his casting as the love interest Mark Darcy in the film adaptation of Bridget Jones's Diary, itself a modern-day retelling of Pride and Prejudice. Firth accepted the part as he saw it as an opportunity to lampoon his Mr. Darcy character. The film was very successful and critically well-liked. A 2004 sequel was mostly panned by critics but still financially successful.

Prior to this, Firth had a significant supporting role in The English Patient (1996) as the husband of Kristin Scott Thomas's character, whose jealousy of her adultery leads to both their deaths. That year he also played the husband of the character of Kristin's sister, Serena Scott Thomas, in the television miniseries Nostromo. Of the two he said "Serena was a much more faithful wife." He had parts in light romantic period pieces such as Shakespeare in Love (1998), Relative Values (2000) and The Importance of Being Earnest (2002).  He appeared in several television productions, including Donovan Quick (an updated version of Don Quixote) (1999), and had a more serious role as Dr. Wilhelm Stuckart in Conspiracy (2001), concerning the Nazi Wannsee Conference, for which he was nominated for a Primetime Emmy Award.

Firth featured in the ensemble all-star cast of Richard Curtis' Love Actually (2003), another financial success which divided critics. He was also given solo billing as the romantic lead in Hope Springs, but it received very poor reviews and made little box-office impact. He played painter Johannes Vermeer opposite Scarlett Johansson in the 2003 release Girl with a Pearl Earring; some critics praised the film's subtlety and sumptuous visuals, whilst others found it almost restrained, tedious and bereft of emotion. Nevertheless, it received mostly favorable reviews, was moderately successful and earned several awards and nominations.

In 2005 Firth appeared in Nanny McPhee with Emma Thompson, in which he plays a struggling widowed father, it was a rare venture for him into the fantasy genre. He also appeared in Where the Truth Lies, a return to some of his darker, more intense early roles, that included a notorious scene featuring a bisexual orgy. Sheila Johnston wrote that it "confounded his fans", but nonetheless that his character "draws knowingly on that suave, cultivated persona", which could be traced from Mr. Darcy. Other films from this time included Then She Found Me (2007) with Helen Hunt and The Last Legion (2007) with Aishwarya Rai.

In 2008, he played the adult Blake Morrison reminiscing on his difficult relationship with his ailing father in the film adaptation of Morrison's memoir, And When Did You Last See Your Father? It received generally favorable reviews. Peter Bradshaw of The Guardian gave it four out of five stars. Manohla Dargis in The New York Times said: "It's a pleasure to watch Mr. Firth–a supremely controlled actor who makes each developing fissure visible–show the adult Blake coming to terms with his contradictory feelings, letting the love and the hurt pour out of him." Philip French of The Observer wrote that Firth "[does] quiet agonising to perfection." However, Derek Elley of Variety called the film "an unashamed tearjerker that's all wrapping and no center."  While he conceded that it was "undeniably effective at a gut level despite its dramatic shortcomings", he added, "Things aren't helped any by Firth's dour perf, as his Blake comes across as a self-centered whiner, a latter-day Me Generation figure who's obsessed with finding problems when there really aren't any."

The film adaptation of Mamma Mia! (2008) was Firth's first foray into musicals. He described the experience as "a bit nerve-wracking" but believed he got off lightly by being tasked with one of the less demanding songs, Our Last Summer. Mamma Mia became the highest grossing British-made film of all time, taking in over $600 million worldwide. Like Love Actually, it polarised critics, with supporters such as Empire calling it "cute, clean, camp fun, full of sunshine, and toe tappers", whereas Peter Bradshaw in The Guardian said the film gave him a "need to vomit". Carrie Rickey in The Philadelphia Inquirer described Firth's performance as "the embodiment of forced mirth." That year, Firth also starred in Easy Virtue, which screened at the Rome Film Festival to excellent reviews. He starred in Genova, which premiered at the 2008 Toronto International Film Festival.
In 2009 he appeared in A Christmas Carol, an adaptation of Charles Dickens's novel, using the performance capture procedure, playing Scrooge's optimistic nephew Fred.

2009–2011: Critical success

At the 66th Venice International Film Festival in 2009, Firth received the Volpi Cup for Best Actor for his role in Tom Ford's directorial debut A Single Man, as a college professor grappling with solitude after the death of his longtime partner. His performance earned him career-best reviews and Academy Award, Golden Globe, Screen Actors' Guild, BAFTA, and BFCA nominations; he won the BAFTA Award for Best Actor in a Leading Role in February 2010.

Firth starred in the 2010 film The King's Speech as Prince Albert, Duke of York/King George VI, detailing his efforts to overcome his speech impediment while becoming monarch of the United Kingdom at the end of 1936. At the Toronto International Film Festival (TIFF), the film received a standing ovation. The TIFF release of The King's Speech fell on Firth's 50th birthday and was called the "best 50th birthday gift". On 16 January 2011, he won a Golden Globe for his performance in The King's Speech in the category of Best Performance by an Actor in a Motion Picture – Drama. The Screen Actors Guild recognised him with the award for Best Male Actor on 30 January 2011.
In February 2011, he won his second consecutive best actor award at the 2011 BAFTA awards, and received an Academy Award for Best Actor in on 27 February 2011. The film grossed $414,211,549 worldwide.

Firth appeared as senior British secret agent Bill Haydon in the 2011 adaptation of the John le Carré novel Tinker Tailor Soldier Spy, directed by Tomas Alfredson and co-starring Gary Oldman, Benedict Cumberbatch, Tom Hardy, Mark Strong and John Hurt. It gathered mostly excellent reviews. The Independent described Firth's performance as "suavely arrogant" and praised the film. Deborah Young in The Hollywood Reporter thought Firth got "all the best dialogue", which he delivered "sardonically". Leslie Felperin in Variety wrote that all the actors brought their "A game" and Firth was in "particularly choleric, amusing form."

2012–present: Established actor

In May 2011, Firth began filming Gambit—a remake of a 1960s crime caper, in the part originally played by Michael Caine. It was released in the UK in November 2012 and was a financial and critical failure. Empire Kim Newman wrote, "Firth starts out homaging Caine with his horn-rimmed cool but soon defaults to his usual repressed British cold mode", whilst Time Out London called his a "likeable performance", although criticised the film overall. Stephen Dalton in The Hollywood Reporter said, "To his credit, Firth keeps his performance grounded in downbeat realism while all around are wildly mugging in desperate pursuit of thin, forced laughs. In 2012, Firth co-founded Raindog Films with British music industry executive and entrepreneur Ged Doherty. Its first feature, Eye in the Sky, for which Firth was co-producer, was released in April 2016.

In May 2013, it was announced that Firth had signed to co-star with Emma Stone in Woody Allen's romantic comedy Magic in the Moonlight, set in the 1920s and shot on the French Riviera. In 2014, he did his first turn as Harry Hart in the spy action film Kingsman: The Secret Service, which grossed $414.4 million against an $81 million budget. Firth had been announced to voice Paddington Bear for the film Paddington, however he announced his withdrawal on 17 June 2014, saying: "It’s been bittersweet to see this delightful creature take shape and come to the sad realization that he simply doesn’t have my voice". 

In June 2015, he began filming the story of amateur yachtsman Donald Crowhurst in The Mercy, alongside Rachel Weisz, David Thewlis and Jonathan Bailey. In 2016, Firth reprised his popular role as Mark Darcy in Bridget Jones's Baby, which fared much better with audiences and critics than the second in the series (Bridget Jones: Edge of Reason). He portrayed American editor Max Perkins in Genius, co-starring Jude Law as author Thomas Wolfe and based on A. Scott Berg's biography Max Perkins: Editor of Genius. In 2016 he began filming for Rupert Everett's directorial debut The Happy Prince, a biopic of Oscar Wilde, playing Wilde's friend Reginald "Reggie" Turner.

In 2017, he reprised his role as Jamie from 2003's Love Actually in the television short film Red Nose Day Actually, by original writer and director Richard Curtis. Also that year, Firth returned as Harry Hart in the sequel Kingsman: The Golden Circle. In 2018, Firth reprised his role of Harry Bright in the sequel to Mamma Mia!, Mamma Mia! Here We Go Again. That year, he also appeared as William Weatherall Wilkins in the musical fantasy film Mary Poppins Returns, starring Emily Blunt in the title role. He also played British naval commander David Russell in Thomas Vinterberg's Kursk, a film about the true story of the 2000 Kursk submarine disaster, in which he starred alongside Matthias Schoenaerts. In 2019, he had a cameo as British General Erinmore in Sam Mendes’ World War I film 1917. Set in 1947 England, Firth starred with Julie Walters in The Secret Garden and later in 2020 with Stanley Tucci in Supernova. In 2021, he starred in romantic drama film Mothering Sunday directed by Eva Husson. In December 2021, he was cast in Sam Mendes' drama film Empire of Light, starring Olivia Colman. He was seen as Ewen Montagu in Operation Mincemeat, in April 2022. Firth returned to television in May 2022 starring as Michael Peterson in the HBO production The Staircase.

Writing
Firth's first published work, "The Department of Nothing", appeared in Speaking with the Angel (2000), a collection of short stories edited by Nick Hornby and published to benefit the TreeHouse Trust to aid autistic children. He met Hornby during the filming of the original Fever Pitch. He contributed to the book We Are One: A Celebration of Tribal Peoples (2009), which explores the cultures, diversity and challenges of indigenous peoples around the world. It features contributions from many Western writers, including Laurens van der Post, Noam Chomsky, Claude Lévi-Strauss; and from indigenous people such as Davi Kopenawa Yanomami and Roy Sesana. Profits from the book's sale benefit the indigenous rights organisation Survival International. Firth was an executive producer for the film In Prison My Whole Life, featuring Noam Chomsky and Angela Davis. It was selected to the 2007 London Film Festival and the 2008 Sundance Film Festival.

In December 2010, Firth was guest editor on BBC Radio 4's Today programme, where he commissioned research to scan the brains of volunteers (mostly university students) to see if there were structural differences that might account for political leanings. The resulting academic paper listed him as an author, along with two University College London researchers and the science reporter of the BBC Radio 4 Today programme. For his contribution, professor John Jost called Firth a 'scientific ambassador' in the field of political neuroscience. The study suggested that conservatives had more development in the amygdala, and liberals in the anterior cingulate cortex.

In 2012, Firth's audiobook recording of Graham Greene's The End of the Affair was released at Audible.com and was declared Audiobook of the Year at the 2013 Audie Awards.

Activism 

Firth has been a longstanding supporter of Survival International, a non-governmental organisation that defends the rights of tribal peoples. Speaking in 2001, he said, "My interest in tribal peoples goes back many years ... and I have supported [Survival] ever since." In 2003, during the promotion of Love Actually, he spoke in defence of the tribal people of Botswana, condemning the Botswana government's eviction of the Gana and Gwi people (San) from the Central Kalahari Game Reserve. He said of the San, "These people are not the remnants of a past era who need to be brought up to date. Those who are able to continue to live on the land that is rightfully theirs are facing the 21st century with a confidence that many of us in the so-called developed world can only envy." He has also backed a Survival International campaign to press the Brazilian government to take more decisive action in defence of the Awá-Guajá people, whose land and livelihood is critically threatened by the actions of loggers.

As a supporter of the Refugee Council, Firth was involved in a campaign to stop the deportation of a group of 42 Congolese asylum seekers, expressing concerns in open letters to The Independent and The Guardian that they faced being murdered on their return to the Democratic Republic of Congo. Firth said: "To me, it's just basic civilisation to help people. I find this incredibly painful to see how we dismiss the most desperate people in our society. It's easily done. It plays to the tabloids, to the Middle-England xenophobes. It just makes me furious. And all from a government we once had such high hopes for". Four of the asylum seekers were given last-minute reprieves from deportation.

Firth, along with other celebrities, has been involved in the Oxfam global campaign Make Trade Fair, focusing on trade practices considered especially unfair to third-world producers, including dumping, high import tariffs, and labour rights. He and some collaborators opened Eco, an eco-friendly shop in West London, which offers fair-trade and eco-friendly goods, and expert advice on making spaces more energy efficient. In October 2009, at the London Film Festival, he launched a film and political activism website, Brightwide (since decommissioned), with his wife Livia.

During the 2010 general election, Firth announced his support for the Liberal Democrats, having previously been a Labour supporter, citing asylum and refugees' rights as key reasons for the change. In December 2010, he publicly dropped his support of the Liberal Democrats, citing their U-turn on tuition fees, and said that he was currently unaffiliated. He appeared in literature supporting changing the British electoral system from first-past-the-post to alternative vote for electing members of parliament to the House of Commons, in the unsuccessful Alternative Vote referendum in 2011.

In 2009, he joined the 10:10 project, supporting the movement calling for people to reduce their carbon footprints. In 2010, he endorsed the "Roots & Shoots" education programme in the UK run by the Jane Goodall Institute (UK).

Personal life

In 1989, Firth began a relationship with Meg Tilly, his co-star in Valmont. Their son, William Joseph Firth, was born in 1990. William is now also an actor, appearing with his father in Bridget Jones's Baby in 2016. The family moved to the Lower Mainland of British Columbia, Canada. Firth's acting career slowed until they broke up in 1994 and he returned to the UK.

During the filming of Pride and Prejudice, Firth and co-star Jennifer Ehle began a romantic relationship, which received media attention only after their separation.

In 1997, Firth married Italian producer Livia Giuggioli. They have two sons, Luca and Matteo. Firth speaks fluent Italian. The family divided their time between Wandsworth, in London, and Umbria, Italy. They announced their separation in 2019. They had gone through a private separation several years prior, but had reconciled.

Firth was a vocal opponent of the Brexit initiative for the United Kingdom to leave the European Union. Following the referendum's passage, and the ensuing uncertainty over rights of non-EU citizens, he applied for "dual citizenship (British and Italian)" in 2017 to "have the same passports as his wife and children". The Italian interior minister, Marco Minniti, announced Firth's application had been approved on 22 September 2017. Firth said, "I will always be extremely British (you only have to look at or listen to me)."

In 2011, after winning the Academy Award for his portrayal of King George VI in The King's Speech, Firth suggested that he may be a republican (anti-monarchist) in a CNN interview with Piers Morgan, saying that voting was "one of his favourite things" and that unelected institutions were "a problem for him".

Acting credits and awards

Firth has received numerous awards, including an Academy Award, Golden Globe Award, British Academy Film Award, and Screen Actors Guild Award for his performance as King George VI in Tom Hooper's historical drama The King's Speech (2010).

He received an honorary doctorate on 19 October 2007 from the University of Winchester. On 13 January 2011, he was presented with the 2,429th star on the Hollywood Walk of Fame. In April 2011, Time included him in its list of the World's 100 Most Influential People. He was made a Freeman of the City of London on 8 March 2012, and was awarded an honorary fellowship by the University of the Arts London in 2012.

Firth was appointed Commander of the Order of the British Empire (CBE) in the 2011 Queen's Birthday Honours for services to drama.

References

External links

 
 
 

1960 births
Living people
20th-century English male actors
21st-century English male actors
Alumni of the Drama Centre London
Alumni of the Royal Conservatoire of Scotland
Audiobook narrators
Best Actor Academy Award winners
Best Actor BAFTA Award winners
Best Drama Actor Golden Globe (film) winners
British male film actors
British expatriates in Italy
British expatriates in Nigeria
British expatriates in the United States
Commanders of the Order of the British Empire
English expatriates in Italy
English expatriates in the United States
English film producers
English male film actors
English male television actors
English male radio actors
English male stage actors
European Film Award for Best Actor winners
Labour Party (UK) people
Male actors from Hampshire
National Youth Theatre members
Naturalised citizens of Italy
Outstanding Performance by a Cast in a Motion Picture Screen Actors Guild Award winners
Outstanding Performance by a Male Actor in a Leading Role Screen Actors Guild Award winners
People from Grayshott
People with acquired Italian citizenship
Volpi Cup for Best Actor winners